The World Bowl was the annual American football championship game of the World League of American Football/NFL Europe. The World Bowl was played each year from 1991 to 2007 (except 1993 and 1994).

The game was conceived as the final of the NFL-related spring league, the World League. The first World Bowl was played in 1991 in London. With the 1995 relaunch of the World League with the North American teams removed, all subsequent World Bowls were played in Europe between European clubs. The only World Bowl to take place outside Europe was World Bowl '92 in Montreal, Canada.

The World Bowl trophy was a globe made of glass measuring 35.5 cm (14 inches) in diameter and weighing 18.6 kg (41 lbs).

Overview

When the World League of American Football (WLAF) was founded in 1991, with teams in North America and Europe as well as expansion plans for Asia, the name World Bowl was appropriate. The name was kept after 1995 when the league limited itself exclusively to Europe.

From 1995 to 1997, the World Bowl venue was decided by the standings after five weeks of the 10-week season. In other years, the sites were predetermined before the season. The 2002 World Bowl was hosted in Rhein Fire's hometown of Düsseldorf as a farewell to the old Rheinstadion. After the new LTU Arena (now Merkur Spiel-Arena) was completed, the 2005 World Bowl was hosted there again. It would return in 2006, the first time that the game was played in the same site in consecutive years. As the city's Fortuna Düsseldorf team spent much of this time in lower tiers of the German soccer pyramid, Düsseldorf was the rare NFL Europe city in which American football held an arguably competitive position.

Nine World Bowls were played on Saturdays and six World Bowls were played on Sundays (1991, 1996-1999, 2000).

World Bowl (WLAF, NFL Europe, and NFL Europa Championships)

Note: Roman numerals were not officially used by NFL Europe until World Bowl IX. Before 2001, the games were titled with the current year, such as World Bowl 2000.

Team records

Results by country

Hosting cities

While the Olympic stadiums in Montreal, Amsterdam and Barcelona hosted World Bowls, the league never selected Berlin as a host town, though the city's Thunder played in the Olympiastadion from 2003 to 2007.

Other uses of "World Bowl"
The former World Football League, a short-lived 1970s competitor to the NFL, was the first to name its championship game the World Bowl. In World Bowl I, the only WFL World Bowl contested, the Birmingham Americans defeated the Florida Blazers 22–21 on December 5, 1974 at Legion Field in Birmingham, Alabama. The game had been scheduled to be played at the Gator Bowl Stadium in Jacksonville, Florida, but after the Jacksonville Sharks folded mid-season, the league decided that the team with the better record would host the game.

The proposed World Indoor Football League that was to begin play in 1988 also intended on calling its championship the World Bowl. It would have been played on August 29, 1988. However, the WIFL disbanded 11 days before its season was to begin.

See also
 List of World Bowl broadcasters